Yoslan Herrera (born April 28, 1981) is a Cuban former professional baseball pitcher. He has also played for the Pittsburgh Pirates and Los Angeles Angels of Anaheim in Major League Baseball (MLB).

Professional career

Pittsburgh Pirates
Herrera made his U.S. pitching debut after defecting from Cuba in July 2005 and signing a Major League contract with the Pirates on December 18, 2006. He was rated by Baseball America as the Pirates' fourth best prospect entering the 2007 season. He was a member of the Pirates' 40-man roster during the '07 season though he spent the entire season with the Double-A Altoona Curve. He went 6–9 with a 4.69 ERA in 25 starts. In 128 innings pitched for the Curve, allowing 151 hits and 38 walks, while striking out 70 batters. Eastern League hitters posted a .296 average against him, including a .315 mark by left-handed batters.

In 2008 Herrera attended Major League spring training as a member of the Pirates' 40-man roster for the second consecutive season. He made 22 starts for Double-A Altoona, one with the Triple-A Indianapolis Indians and five in the Major Leagues with Pittsburgh. He was a member of the Curve's Opening Day roster for the second consecutive season. In 22 starts with Altoona he went 6–9 with a 3.46 ERA in a team-high 114 innings. Herrera was named Eastern League Pitcher of the Week for the week ending June 8 after his eight scoreless inning performance on June 6. He was promoted to Indianapolis for a spot start on June 27 against the Columbus Clippers and earned the win in his Triple-A debut, scattering seven hits and allowing only two runs. He returned to Altoona on June 29 Herrera was recalled by Pittsburgh on July 12 and made his Major League debut that night. He pitched 4 innings, giving up six earned runs, and stuck out four. He earned his first major league win on July 24, shutting out the San Diego Padres through six innings. Hererra was optioned back to the Double-A Curve on August 4.

Herrera split the 2009 season between the Double-A Curve and the Triple-A Indians. With the Curve he went 11–1 with a 3.23 ERA with 65 strikeouts, giving up five home runs in 97 innings pitched in 23 games, 15 starts. In four games with the Indians Herrera went 1–1 with a 2.30 ERA in 15 innings pitched. In November 2009, the Pirates released Herrera.

Minnesota Twins

On March 2, 2010, Herrera signed a minor league deal with the Minnesota Twins. In May 2010, Herrera asked for and received his release.

Los Angeles Angels of Anaheim
Herrera signed a minor league deal with the Los Angeles Angels of Anaheim in December 2013.

See also

List of baseball players who defected from Cuba

References

External links

1981 births
Living people
Major League Baseball players from Cuba
Cuban expatriate baseball players in the United States
Major League Baseball pitchers
Pittsburgh Pirates players
Los Angeles Angels players
Altoona Curve players
Indianapolis Indians players
Rochester Red Wings players
Lancaster Barnstormers players
Salt Lake Bees players
People from Pinar del Río
Defecting Cuban baseball players
Cuban expatriate baseball players in Japan
Nippon Professional Baseball pitchers
Yokohama DeNA BayStars players
Navegantes del Magallanes players
Cuban expatriate baseball players in Venezuela
Algodoneros de Guasave players
Cuban expatriate baseball players in Mexico